Klasdorf Glashütte is a railway station in the village of Klasdorf in the municipality of Baruth/Mark, Brandenburg, Germany. The station lies of the Berlin–Dresden railway and the train services are operated by Deutsche Bahn.

Train services
The station is served by the following services:

Regional services  Rostock – Neustrelitz – Berlin – Wunsdorf-Waldstadt – Klasdorf Glashütte – Elsterwerda

References

External links

VBB website
Berlin-Brandenburg (VBB) network map

Railway stations in Brandenburg
Buildings and structures in Teltow-Fläming
Railway stations in Germany opened in 1875